The 2020 BC Men's Curling Championship, the provincial men's curling championship for British Columbia, was held from January 28 to February 2, 2020, at the Western Financial Place in Cranbrook. The winning Jim Cotter rink represented British Columbia at the 2020 Tim Hortons Brier in Kingston, Ontario and finished with a 2–5 record. The event was held in conjunction with the 2020 British Columbia Scotties Tournament of Hearts.

Jim Cotter won his ninth BC Men's Curling Championship when he defeated former world junior champion Tyler Tardi 10–6 in the final.

Teams
The teams are listed as follows:

Knockout brackets
The draw is listed as follows:

A Event

B Event

C Event

Playoffs

A vs. B
Saturday, February 1, 2:00 pm

C1 vs. C2
Saturday, February 1, 2:00 pm

Semifinal
Saturday, February 1, 7:00 pm

Final
Sunday, February 2, 2:00 pm

References

BC Men's Curling Championship
Curling Championship, Men's
Curling in British Columbia
BC Men's Curling
BC Men's Curling
Cranbrook, British Columbia